At the 1960 Summer Olympics in Rome, eight events in fencing were contested.  Men competed in both individual and team events for each of the three weapon types (épée, foil and sabre), but women competed only in foil events.

Medal summary

Men's events

Women's events

Medal table

Participating nations
A total of 344 fencers (266 men and 78 women) from 42 nations competed at the Rome Games:

References

External links
 

 
1960 Summer Olympics events
1960
1960 in fencing
International fencing competitions hosted by Italy